Nicolas Hasler (born 4 May 1991) is a  Liechtensteiner professional footballer who plays as a  left or right midfielder for FC Vaduz in the Swiss Challenge League and captains the Liechtenstein national team. He is the son of Rainer Hasler, who was one of Liechtenstein's greatest professional footballers.

Club career

FC Triesen & FC Balzers
Hasler began his youth career with FC Triesen and moved onto FC Balzers youth side in 2003.

FC Vaduz
In June 2017, Hasler left Vaduz, a club he had been with for the previous six seasons, after he was unable to come to terms with the club over a new contract.

Toronto FC
On 13 July 2017 Hasler signed with Toronto FC of Major League Soccer. In the first season with Toronto, he won the MLS Cup and MLS Supporters Shield, and reached the 2018 CONCACAF Champions League final, which Toronto lost on penalties.

Chicago Fire
On 20 July 2018, Hasler was traded to Chicago Fire in exchange for Jon Bakero and $50,000 in General Allocation Money.

On 28 March 2019, Hasler was released by Chicago.

Sporting Kansas City
On 2 April 2019, Hasler was signed by Sporting Kansas City. The club placed him on waivers at the end of the season, but he was not signed by any other MLS club.

FC Thun
Hasler joined Swiss club FC Thun for the remainder of the season on 14 January 2020. However, the club failed to stave off relegation to the Challenge League and Hasler was released. However, Hasler would later return to Thun on a one-year deal.

Return to FC Vaduz

On 18 May 2022, it was announced that Hasler was returning to Vaduz on a three-year deal.

International career
He was a member of the Liechtenstein national under-21 football team and had 10 caps. Hasler received his first call-up to the senior team and made his debut in the friendly versus Iceland on 11 August 2010. He is the current captain of the Liechtenstein national football team.

Career statistics

Club

International

International goals

Honours

Club
FC Vaduz
 Swiss Challenge League (1): 2013–14
 Liechtensteiner Cup (5): 2012–13, 2013–14, 2014–15, 2015–16, 2016–17

Toronto FC
 MLS Cup (1): 2017
 Supporters' Shield (1): 2017
 Canadian Championship (1): 2018
 CONCACAF Champions League runners-up: 2018

Individual
 Liechtensteiner Footballer of the Year (3): 2015, 2017, 2018
 Liechtensteiner Young Player of the Year (2): 2011, 2012

References

External links
 
 

1991 births
Living people
Association football midfielders
Liechtenstein expatriate footballers
Liechtenstein footballers
Liechtenstein international footballers
People from Vaduz
Chicago Fire FC players
FC Balzers players
FC Vaduz players
Sporting Kansas City players
Toronto FC players
FC Triesen players
USV Eschen/Mauren players
FC Thun players
Swiss Challenge League players
Swiss Super League players
Major League Soccer players
Expatriate soccer players in the United States
Expatriate soccer players in Canada
Expatriate footballers in Switzerland
Liechtenstein expatriate sportspeople in the United States
Liechtenstein expatriate sportspeople in Switzerland